Derwa is a village in Kunda tehsil of Pratapgarh district in the Indian state of Uttar Pradesh.

References

Villages in Pratapgarh district, Uttar Pradesh